The Deadstone Memorial is a BBC Books original novel written by Trevor Baxendale and based on the long-running British science fiction television series Doctor Who. It features the Eighth Doctor, Fitz and Trix.

The central plot revolves around a young boy who is having terrible nightmares until the Doctor shows up and offers his help...

External links
The Cloister Library - The Deadstone Memorial

2004 British novels
2004 science fiction novels
Eighth Doctor Adventures
Novels by Trevor Baxendale